Li Jinai (b. July 1942) is a general in the People's Liberation Army.

Biography
Li Jinai was born in Teng County (now Tengzhou), Shandong in July 1942. He joined the Chinese Communist Party (CPC) in May 1965 and joined the People's Liberation Army (PLA) in December 1967. He graduated from the Harbin Institute of Technology in 1966 majoring in Engineering Mechanics.

He was rose to the General Political Department of the PLA in 1985 and became the deputy director there in 1990. From 1992 to 1998, he served the State Commission of Science and Technology for National Defense Industry as deputy political commissar and later political commissar. From 1998 to 2002, he was the political commissar and vice party's secretary of the General Armament Department and was elected as director of that department as well as a member of the Central Military Commission (CMC) of the Communist Party in 2002. One year later, he was elected as a member of CMC of the state.

In September 2004, he was appointed the director of the General Political Department of the PLA while holding the position of member of CMC of the party and the state.

He was an alternate member of the 14th Central Committee of the Communist Party of China and a regular member of the 15th, 16th and 17th central committees.

References

Living people
1942 births
Politicians from Zaozhuang
People's Liberation Army generals from Shandong
Chinese Communist Party politicians from Shandong
People's Republic of China politicians from Shandong